Ernie Alfred Godden (born March 13, 1961 in Keswick, Ontario) is a retired professional ice hockey centre who played five games for the Toronto Maple Leafs of the NHL  He was chosen 55th overall by the Toronto Maple Leafs in 1981 after scoring 87 goals as a junior in the OHL and making the league's first all-star team. In addition to his brief tenure in Toronto, Godden spent his first three years as a top scorer in the CHL with the Cincinnati Tigers and the AHL's St. Catharines Saints. Godden played one year with Klagenfurter of Austria before retiring in 1985.

Perhaps his most notable accomplishments occurred while he was with the Windsor Spitfires of the Ontario Hockey League. In the 1980–81 season, he set an OHL record with 87 goals. This record is yet to be broken.  During that season he totalled 153 points for the year.

He has a devoted following within the Ernie Godden fan club, which consists of many Essex County residents.

He currently coaches Minor Hockey in LaSalle, Ontario, for his son's team.

Career statistics

External links

1961 births
Canadian ice hockey centres
Cincinnati Tigers players
Ice hockey people from Ontario
EC KAC players
Living people
Toronto Maple Leafs draft picks
Toronto Maple Leafs players
St. Catharines Saints players
Windsor Spitfires players